The 1998 Harvard Crimson football team was an American football team that represented Harvard University during the 1998 NCAA Division I-AA football season. The Crimson tied for fifth in the Ivy League.

In their fifth year under head coach Timothy Murphy, the Crimson compiled a 4–6 record and were outscored 211 to 136. Brendan Bibro was the team captain.

Harvard's 3–4 conference record tied for fifth in the Ivy League standings. The Crimson were outscored 142 to 86 by Ivy opponents.

Harvard played its home games at Harvard Stadium in the Allston neighborhood of Boston, Massachusetts.

Schedule

References

Harvard
Harvard Crimson football seasons
Harvard Crimson football
Harvard Crimson football